Eldrid Margrete Straume (1929 – 29 December 2014) was a Norwegian archaeologist.

She hailed from Sandane. She graduated from the University of Bergen in 1956, and studied for two years in Germany. In 1964, she was hired as a lecturer at the University of Oslo. She took her doctorate degree in 1984, and specialized in the archaeology of Norway. She was hired as a professor at the University of Bergen in 1990, but after a few years returned to Oslo as a professor there. She was a fellow of the Norwegian Academy of Science and Letters.

References

1929 births
2014 deaths
People from Gloppen
Archaeologists from Oslo
University of Bergen alumni
Academic staff of the University of Oslo
Academic staff of the University of Bergen
Members of the Norwegian Academy of Science and Letters
Norwegian women academics
Archaeologists from Bergen
Norwegian women archaeologists